The Tasman Spirit was a Greek registered oil tanker.  The tanker was launched in February 1979 and was formerly called the Mabini and Kenko.

Tasman Spirit oil spill 

On July 27, 2003, she ran aground near the city of Karachi whist on approach to the Port of Karachi. Over the next few days more than 33,000 tons of oil spilled into the Arabian Sea in what is considered by some to be the largest environmental disaster in Pakistan's history. Cracks began to appear on the ship's hull on August 13 and the ship began to break up. By August 17, the ship had split into two, releasing some 12,000 tons of its light crude oil cargo into the Arabian Sea. According to the IUCN 16 kilometres of coastline has been polluted.

The ship's insurer offered 10 million rupees (about $180,000 US dollars in 2003) in compensation to the Karachi port authorities, and agreed to pay all cleaning expenses.

References

   Tasman Spirit oil spill  collection of articles at Coordination marée noire

https://web.archive.org/web/20041118141048/http://www.hipakistan.com/en/detail.php?newsId=en35669&F_catID=&f_type=source

Oil spills in Asia
Maritime incidents in 2003
Maritime incidents in Pakistan
Oil tankers
History of Sindh (1947–present)
1979 ships
Ships built in Japan